The 2016 NAB Challenge was the Australian Football League (AFL) pre-season competition played before the 2016 home and away season. It featured 27 matches across 25 days, beginning February 18 and ending March 13. It was the third year in a row where the competition did not have a Grand Final or overall winner. All matches were televised live on Fox Footy as well as on the AFL Live app.

The match between Carlton and Essendon, played on 28 February 2016 at Princes Park was umpired by Eleni Glouftsis, the first female field umpire to officiate in a match sanctioned by the AFL.

Results

References

NAB Challenge
Australian Football League pre-season competition